William Travis "Bully" Van de Graaff (October 25, 1895 – April 26, 1977) was an American football player, coach, and college athletics administrator. He attended Tuscaloosa High School. He played college football at the University of Alabama, where he was selected as an All-American in 1915, Alabama's first. He was 6'1" 187 pounds. "Bully" was placed on an Associated Press Southeast Area All-Time football team 1869-1919 era. Van de Graaff served as the head football coach at Colorado College from 1926 to 1939, compiling a record of 49–54–6.  He coached hall of famer Dutch Clark. He died in Colorado Springs, Colorado on April 26, 1977 at the age of 81.  He was the older brother of physicist Robert J. Van de Graaff, the designer of the Van de Graaff generator which produces high voltages. Bully's two older brothers, Hargrove and Adrian, were also Alabama football players.

Head coaching record

References

External links
 

1895 births
1977 deaths
American football tackles
Alabama Crimson Tide football coaches
Alabama Crimson Tide football players
Colorado College Tigers athletic directors
Colorado College Tigers football coaches
All-Southern college football players
United States Army officers
United States Military Academy alumni
Sportspeople from Tuscaloosa, Alabama
Coaches of American football from Alabama
Players of American football from Alabama
American people of Dutch descent